Hellinsia habecki is a moth of the family Pterophoridae. It is found in Florida, including the type location of Liberty County.

References

habecki
Moths of North America
Natural history of Florida
Moths described in 2010